Zirconium carbide (ZrC) is an extremely hard refractory ceramic material, commercially used in tool bits for cutting tools. It is usually processed by sintering.

Properties

It appears as a gray metallic powder with cubic crystal structure. It is highly corrosion resistant. This Group IV interstitial transition-metal carbide is also a member of ultra high temperature ceramics or (UHTC). Due to the presence of metallic bonding, ZrC has a thermal conductivity of 20.5 W/m·K and an electrical conductivity (resistivity ~43 μΩ·cm), both of which are similar to that for zirconium metal. The strong covalent Zr-C bond gives this material a very high melting point (~3530 °C), high modulus (~440 GPa) and hardness (25 GPa). ZrC has a lower density (6.73 g/cm3) compared to other carbides like WC (15.8 g/cm3), TaC (14.5 g/cm3) or HfC (12.67 g/cm3). ZrC seems suitable for use in re-entry vehicles, rocket/scramjet engines or supersonic vehicles in which low densities and high temperatures load-bearing capabilities are crucial requirements.

Like most carbides of refractory metals, zirconium carbide is sub-stoichiometric, i.e., it contains carbon vacancies. At carbon contents higher than approximately ZrC0.98 the material contains free carbon.  ZrC is stable for a carbon-to-metal ratio ranging from 0.65 to 0.98.

The group IVA metal carbides, TiC, ZrC, and SiC are practically inert toward attack by strong aqueous acids (HCl) and strong aqueous bases (NaOH) even at 100' C, however, ZrC does react with HF.

The mixture of zirconium carbide and tantalum carbide is an important cermet material.

Uses
Hafnium-free zirconium carbide and niobium carbide can be used as refractory coatings in nuclear reactors. Because of a low neutron absorption cross-section and weak damage sensitivity under irradiation, it finds use as the coating of uranium dioxide and thorium dioxide particles of nuclear fuel. The coating is usually deposited by thermal chemical vapor deposition in a fluidized bed reactor. It also has high emissivity and high current capacity at elevated temperatures rendering it as a promising material for use in thermo-photovoltaic radiators and field emitter tips and arrays.

It is also used as an abrasive, in cladding, in cermets, incandescent filaments and cutting tools.

Production
Zirconium carbide can be fabricated in several ways. One method is carbothermic reaction of zirconia by graphite. This results in a powder. Densified ZrC can then be made by sintering the powder of ZrC at upwards of 2000 °C. Hot pressing of ZrC can bring down the sintering temperature and consequently helps in producing fine grained fully densified ZrC. Spark plasma sintering also has been used to produce fully densified ZrC.

Zirconium carbide can also be fabricated by solution based processing. This is achieved by refluxing a metal oxide with acetylacetone.

Another method of fabrication is chemical vapour deposition. This is achieved by heating a zirconium sponge and parsing halide gas through it.

Poor oxidation resistance over 800 °C limits the applications of ZrC. One way to improve the oxidation resistance of ZrC is to make composites. Important composites proposed are ZrC-ZrB2 and ZrC-ZrB2-SiC composite. These composites can work up to 1800 °C. Another method to improve this is to use another material as a barrier layer such as in TRISO fuel particles.

References

Zirconium(IV) compounds
Carbides
Superhard materials
Refractory materials
Rock salt crystal structure